Henry Norman Charles Bandidt, MBE (12 December 1906 – 6 January 1990) was an Australian politician. Born near Galton, Queensland, he was educated at Ipswich Grammar School and the University of Queensland before becoming a solicitor in 1931. He was a dairy farmer, writer and lecturer, as well as an official with the Queensland branch of the Country Party. In 1958, he was elected to the Australian House of Representatives as the Country Party member for Wide Bay. He was defeated in 1961. Bandidt died in 1990.

References

National Party of Australia members of the Parliament of Australia
Members of the Australian House of Representatives for Wide Bay
Members of the Australian House of Representatives
Members of the Order of the British Empire
1906 births
1990 deaths
20th-century Australian politicians